David Fintz Altabé (1929–2008), was an internationally known scholar and poet specializing in Judeo-Spanish literature and Sephardic culture. He served twice as President of the American Society of Sephardic Studies as well as Vice-President of the American Association of Jewish Friends of Turkey. He also was on the Sephardic Council of Overseers and taught Spanish at the City University of New York where he was honored as professor emeritus.

He was born in New York City to Sephardic parents of Turkish origin and died in November 2008.

Works authored
Temas y Dialogos (1970).
"The significance of 1492 to the Jews and Muslims of Spain.” Hispania (September 1992).
Spanish and Portuguese Jewry Before and After 1492 (1993).
Una Kozecha de Rimas i Konsejas: A Harvest of Rhymes and Folk-Tales. (2000).

As an editor:

Altabé, David Fintz, Erhan Atay, and Israel J. Katz, eds. Studies on Turkish Jewish History: political and social relations, literature, and linguistics: the quincentennial papers. Brooklyn, NY: Sepher-Hermon Press, 1996.

Works translated
Sadacca, Haim Vitali. Un Ramo de Poemas: A Bouquet of Poems. Translated by David Fintz Altabé. New York: Foundation for the Advancement of Sephardic Studies and Culture, 2009.
Bécquer, Gustavo Adolfo. Symphony of Love: Las Rimas. Translated by David Fintz Altabé and Joan Altabé. Long Beach, NY: Regina, 1974.

References

External links
Guide to the David Fintz Altabé Papers at the American Sephardi Federation, New York.

1929 births
2008 deaths
Poets from New York (state)
Writers from New York City
City University of New York faculty
Columbia College (New York) alumni
20th-century American poets